Vittorio Sega (8 April 1935 – 16 June 2022) was an Italian politician. A member of the Italian Communist Party, he served in the Senate of the Republic from 1979 to 1987.

Sega died in Adria on 16 June 2022 at the age of 87.

References

1935 births
2022 deaths
Senators of Legislature VIII of Italy
Senators of Legislature IX of Italy
Italian Communist Party politicians
People from Adria